Dardasht is an eastern neighbourhood of Tehran, Iran. Dardasht is situated near the large Tehranpars quarter. It is also the name of the Tehran Metro station which is the starting point of Tehran Metro's line 2. The Iran University of Science and Technology is also situated near the Dardasht station.
دردشت ،نام خیابانی در منطقه 8،محله نارمک شرقی ،تهران
این خیابان حد فاصل بزرگراه شهید سلیمانی ،کلبرگ شرقی  و شهید ثانی را بهم وصل میکند
ایستگاه مترو دانشگاه علم و صنعت در تقاطع خیابان دردشت و بزرگراه شهید سلیمانی قرار دارد

References

Neighbourhoods in Tehran